Fara Vicentino is a town in the province of Vicenza, Veneto, Italy. It is north of SP111.

Sources
(Google Maps)

References

Cities and towns in Veneto